Soyangi or Suoyuŋu is a rural locality (a selo) in Kangalassky 1-y Rural Okrug of Srednekolymsky District in the Sakha Republic, Russia, located  from Srednekolymsk, the administrative center of the district, and  from Aleko-Kyuyol, the administrative center of the rural okrug. It had no recorded population as of the 2010 Census; unchanged from the 2002 Census.

References

Notes

Sources
Official website of the Sakha Republic. Registry of the Administrative-Territorial Divisions of the Sakha Republic. Srednekolymsky District. 

Rural localities in Srednekolymsky District